New Generation Wrestling (NGW) is a currently active British professional wrestling promotion based in Hull, founded by Luke Ingamells in 2008. Its next show is Collision Course on 11 March 2023 at Eastmount Centre in Hull.

NGW is featured regularly on Challenge TV's WrestleTalk and British Wrestling Round-Up programs, and on Bay TV Liverpool and the Lincolnshire-based Estuary TV.

History

The Eastmount Years (2008–2012)
New Generation Wrestling put on its first event on 16 May 2008 at Hull's Eastmount Recreation Centre. Line-ups featured local new wrestlers, such as "Prima Donna" Nathan Cruz and "The Amazing" Matt Myers, and wrestlers from the British independent circuit, such as Dave Rayne and Stixx.

The rivalry between Nathan Cruz and 15-year veteran Alex Shaneculminated in a match between the two at NGW's 2nd Anniversary Show in June 2010. This match saw Cruz defeat Shane for the right to the "Showstealer" moniker. Cruz went on to become a successful heel (villain) in the company, winning the NGW Championship in early 2011 and holding it for nearly a year. At Eternal Glory in December 2011, Cruz lost the title to Matt Myers.

In December 2011, NGW held its first show on the road at Pontefract Town Hall.

The Sports Arena and TV Exposure (2012–2015)

As the NGW following grew, the promotion held its first event at Hull's Sports Arena (now the Airco Arena) in July 2012, featuring appearances from former WWE Diva and TNA Knockout Winter, as well as British wrestler Kendo Nagasaki. While the majority of NGW shows remained at the Eastmount Recreation Centre, the July event was the first of many regular happenings at the Arena, which promoter Richard Dunn had wanted to use for wrestling for years. NGW shows at the Arena were watched by wrestler-turned-TV-producer Alex Shane.

Starting late 2012 and continuing throughout 2013, developments surrounding NGW events and storylines were covered regularly on WrestleTalk TV, a wrestling talk show on Challenge TV produced by Shane. In April 2013, a spin-off series was launched by the British Wrestling Council titled BWC: British Wrestling Round-Up in what was effectively British wrestling's return to national television for the first time in 25 years. NGW remained a staple of the show throughout its several changes in format and has used the platform to showcase matches to a nationwide audience. In 2014 there was an increase in the number of shows put on at the Sports Arena, later renamed the Airco Arena.

In early 2013, NGW Champion Rampage Brown had a storyline falling-out with management, resulting in him no longer being recognised as the titleholder, despite still being in possession of the belt. As a new champion was crowned in his absence, the company ended up having two champions when Rampage made his return several months later and aligned himself with NGW owner Richie West's faction The Control. The rivalry between El Ligero and Rampage Brown over the rightful claim to the NGW Championship was the most prominent story throughout 2014, culminating in a critically acclaimed 30-Minute Iron Man Match between the two at Eternal Glory in December. Rampage picked up the victory after a shocking attack by Ligero's best friend and tag team partner, Dara Diablo, and became the first ever NGW Undisputed Champion.

Another focal point of NGW programming has been the ongoing Davey Boy Cup Tournament, put together by the daughter of the late British Bulldog, Georgia Smith. Following qualifying matches which took place throughout 2014, the four finalists were revealed in early 2015 to be Nathan Cruz, Zack Gibson, Bubblegum and Mike "Wildboar" Hitchman, with matches among them scheduled for the next few months.

In March 2015, the announcement was made that NGW matches would be available on-demand as part of the BWC British Wrestling Weekly subscription service.

Hull City Hall (2015)
In March 2015, plans to install an indoor football pitch at the Airco Arena effectively blocked local communities from the venue, among them New Generation Wrestling, who later announced that they had acquired the Hull City Hall for future shows.

NGW Academy
NGW runs its own wrestling academy. The Academy provides training for aspiring in-ring performers and for auxiliary roles. Advanced classes at the Academy's Hull facility are led by Nathan Cruz and Matt Myers. The Academy also holds seminars with guest trainers including Fit Finlay, Doug Williams, Nigel McGuinness, Winter, Rockstar Spud, Dave Taylor and many more. it has at regular 7 people and will hopefully get future stars .

The NGW Academy launched a second facility in Birtley, Gateshead in the summer of 2014 with head trainer Rampage Brown.

NGW Proving Ground
February 2011 saw the start of a series of Academy shows under the "NGW Proving Ground" banner. Acting as developmental events, the main objective of the shows is to showcase the future stars of British wrestling, but they also feature established names of the main roster.

As of 2018, the company introduced the Proving Ground Championship where the inaugural champion was upcomer Ace Matthews. 
2020 saw the company also introduce the Proving Ground Tag Team Championship. The first six Proving Ground events took place at the Eastmount Recreation Centre in Hull, but ever since February 2013, they have almost exclusively been held on the road.

Partnership with Global Force Wrestling
In July 2014, Jeff Jarrett's Global Force Wrestling announced working partnerships with several European promotions, including New Generation Wrestling, representing Northern England.

Championships
Current champions

NGW Undisputed Championship
The NGW Undisputed Championship is a professional wrestling Championship (professional wrestling) owned by the New Generation Wrestling (NGW) promotion. The title was created and debuted on 16 May 2009. The current champion is Lucas Steel, who is in his first reign.

Combined reigns 

{| class="wikitable sortable" style="text-align: center"
!Rank
!Wrestler
!No. ofreigns
!Combineddays
|-
!1
| Nathan Cruz || 3 || 1,310
|-
!2
| Rampage Brown || 2 || 570
|-
!3
| El Ligero || 1 || 390
|-
!4
| Alex Cyanide || 1 || 383
|-
!5
|style="background-color:#FFE6BD"| Lucas Steel † || 1 || +
|-
!6
| Justin Sysum || 1 || 287
|-
!7
| Matt Myers || 2 || 271
|-
!8
| Mark Haskins || 1 || 239
|-
!9
| Sam Bailey || 1 || 244
|-

NGW Tag Team Championship
The NGW Tag Team Championship is a professional wrestling Championship (professional wrestling) owned by the New Generation Wrestling (NGW) promotion. The title was created and debuted on 4 December 2011. The current champions are Matt Myers and Robbie X who are in their first reign.

NGW GenX Championship
The NGW GenX Championship is a professional wrestling Championship (professional wrestling) owned by the New Generation Wrestling (NGW) promotion. The title was created and debuted on 22 December 2015.

The current champion is Lucas Steel, who is in his First reign.

NGW Proving Ground Championship

See also

Professional wrestling in the United Kingdom
WrestleTalk TV

References

External links

British professional wrestling promotions
2008 establishments in England
Entertainment companies established in 2008